The Constitutional Act on the Rights of National Minorities in the Republic of Croatia is constitutional law which defines rights of national minorities in Croatia. It is one of in total three Constitutional Acts in the Croatian legal system, with the other two being the Constitutional Act on Implementation of the Constitution of Croatia and the Constitutional Act on the Constitutional Court of Croatia. In its current form, the Act entered into force on 23 December 2002. Its earlier version, under the title Constitutional Act on National and Ethnic Communities or Minorities was passed in December 1991 as a precondition of the international community for the recognition of Croatian independence from the Socialist Federal Republic of Yugoslavia. The Act is hierarchically under the Constitution of Croatia and must comply with it, but above ordinary state laws and decisions, and above statutes and decisions of lower levels of government, which all must be in accordance with this law. Additionally, two special laws were created to define rights regarding education in minority languages and specific rights on the usage of minority languages in public life (Law on Use of Languages and Scripts of National Minorities and The Law on Education in language and script of national minorities). Additionally, the Constitution of Croatia itself has articles directly relating to the protection of national minorities, and lists traditional minorities in Croatia.

History

Constitutional Act on National and Ethnic Communities or Minorities

In December 1991 Croatian Parliament adopted the "Constitutional Act on Human Rights and Freedoms and Rights of National and Ethnic Communities or Minorities in the Republic of Croatia" which was prerequisite for international recognition of Croatia.

From period of Socialist Federal Republic of Yugoslavia Croatia inherited and recognized relatively high level of protection of collective minority rights. Problem arose with protection of rights of "new minorities", respectively members of other six constituent nations of former state excluding Croats (Serbs, Slovenes, Bosniaks, Macedonians and Montenegrins). The problem was especially pronounced with Serbs of Croatia that had status of sovereign people within Socialist Republic of Croatia.

In 1992 Croatia changed law in order to include right on political autonomy in areas where minorities are actually majority of population. In addition to right to be represented and wide rights on cultural autonomy law now provided right to establish autonomous districts in areas where some minority constitute majority according to 1981 Yugoslav census. However, in practice this provision was never implemented since areas that fulfilled conditions were part of Republic of Serbian Krajina.

Constitutional Law provided two types of monitoring of its implementation- international monitoring and cooperation in its implementation with Autonomous Districts.

In late September 1995 after Operation Storm Croatia returned control over its entire territory except Eastern Slavonia, Baranja and Western Syrmia region which came under control of UNTAES. Croatian Parliament initially temporarily suspended application of Law provisions granting right on political autonomy sparking international criticism. Subsequently that part was completely abolished.

One of the first preconditions for starting of Accession of Croatia to the European Union was adoption of new law on national minorities rights.

Rights

Right to be represented

Croatian Parliament

Under the Constitutional Act on the Rights of National Minorities, national minorities that participate in total population of Croatia with more than 1.5% (only Serbs of Croatia) are guaranteed minimum one and maximum of three seats in Croatian Parliament. Minorities that constitute less than 1.5% of total population (other minorities) can elect 4 members of Parliament in total.

Law proscribed establishment of special District XII of Croatian Parliament electoral districts for elections of representatives of national minorities.

Regional and local level
Under the Constitutional Act on the Rights of National Minorities, municipalities and cities or towns where members of minority consist from 5% up to 15% they have right to have one representative in local council. If locally some minority consist more than 15% or at the county level more than 5% of population, that minority have right on proportional representation in local and regional councils.

In administrative units where national minority have right on proportional representation in representative bodies, it also have right on proportional representation in executive bodies. Minorities have right to elect deputies of municipal/town/city mayor or deputy county prefects.

National minorities have right on proportional representation in government bodies and judicial authorities in proportion in which they participate in total population of area in which that body performs its jurisdiction.

In order to realize these rights members of national minorities have right of priority in employment when they explicitly invoke that right in application and when they equally as other candidates meet all other criteria.

State Council for National Minorities

State Council for National Minorities is an autonomous umbrella body of national minorities at the state level that connects institutions and interests of national minorities in Croatia. It is a body that deals with comprehensive minority issues within the Constitutional Law on National Minorities and all other laws pertaining to national minorities.

Council is entitled to propose discussions regarding national minorities to Parliament and Government of Croatia, especially about issues regarding implementation of Constitutional Law and special laws regulating the rights of national minorities. Council have the right to give opinions and proposals about public radio and television stations programs as well as proposals for the implementation of economic, social and other measures in regions traditionally or predominantly inhabited by national minorities. Furthermore, the Council has the right to seek and obtain the required data and reports from government bodies and local and regional governments.

There are three types of representation in Council. All minority MPs automatically enter the Council. The second group, which consists of five members, are representatives of national minorities from the professional, cultural, religious and scientific community and representatives of minority associations, appointed by the Government on the proposal of associations, legal entities and citizens belonging to national minorities. The third group are representatives from the Council for National Minorities, which has seven members.

National Minorities Councils

Serb National Council

The Serb National Council is elected political, consulting and coordinating body acting as a form of self-government and institution of cultural autonomy of Serbs of Croatia in matters regarding civil rights and cultural identity. Council main focuses are human, civil and national rights, as well the issues of Serbs of Croatia identity, participation and integration in the Croatian society. County level council exist in city of Zagreb and all counties except Krapina-Zagorje County.

Joint Council of Municipalities

Alongside Serb National Council, interests of the Serb ethnic community in the Osijek-Baranja and Vukovar-Syrmia County are additionally represented by Joint Council of Municipalities, sui generis body formed on the basis of Erdut Agreement. Organization functions as National Coordination body in these two counties.

Action Plan for Law implementation
Government adopt regular two-year action plans for implementation of Constitutional law. For implementation of 2011-2013 Action plan government has allocated 143,704,348 Croatian kunas.

Criticisms
On tenth anniversary of Constitutional law Serb Democratic Forum sent a statement arguing that law served just to strengthen minority elites and did not actually strengthen the rights of national minorities. According to them, Constitutional Law is just collection of good wishes and European standards which face constant obstruction from state and at local levels. They add that national minority councils have failed to consume their role and become bodies without any real role and functions in local communities while Council for National Minorities became politicized institution through which minority elites generate their own, and not the interests of the minority communities they represent.

In 2011 Constitutional Court of Croatia after Left of Croatia, Serb Democratic Forum, Croatian Helsinki Committee and GONG repealed Law provision which guaranteed that Serbian minority will elect three members of parliament in one of regular constituency. This provision was enacted as a compromise between part of representatives of Serbian community and Jadranka Kosor government after government introduced double vote rights for all minorities except Serbs. Court pointed out that no one can have guaranteed number of places in parliament but that government can introduce double voting rights for all minorities in special minority constituency and regular territorial one.

See also
Minority languages of Croatia
Act of Parliament

References

Law of Croatia
National human rights instruments
Minority rights
2002 in law
2002 in Croatia
Language policy in Bosnia and Herzegovina, Croatia, Montenegro and Serbia